Khom script may refer to either of the following writing systems derived from the Khmer script:

Khom Thai script, a script based on ancient Khmer and historically used in Thailand
Khom script (Ong Kommadam), a script developed in Laos by the rebel leader Ong Kommadam in the 1920s